The February 12–14, 2017 North American blizzard was a strong and historic nor'easter that affected the Northeastern United States and Eastern Canada from February 12–14. It impacted the Northeastern United States less than a week after the February 9–11, 2017 North American blizzard. This blizzard was more localized and less widespread than the previous storm, but snow totals were higher in some areas, including portions of Maine and Vermont. The system caused 2 fatalities and is estimated to have caused over $3.9 million (2017 USD) in damages. It was unofficially named Winter Storm Orson by The Weather Channel.

Meteorological history 
The system originated as a weak low-pressure system over the Great Lakes region early on February 12, which quickly began to strengthen due to abundant moisture. It quickly moved eastwards into the Mid-Atlantic states by 18:00 UTC, with precipitation bands developing by that time. The system then slowed its movement down, stalling out in the Gulf of Maine and resulting in prolonged periods of heavy snow. It began moving again on December 14, moving into Canada and beginning to weaken. The low-pressure continued slowly weakening before dissipating early on February 15.

Preparations and impact

Northeastern United States 

The snow caused widespread travel problems, such as numerous automobile accidents, and other hardships such as a collapsed roof in Millinocket, Maine. The strong wind gusts downed trees and power lines with some trees crushing houses. Schools, businesses, medical offices, public transportation and government offices were shut down in a large part of the Northeast while flights and events were cancelled, such as courses at the University of Maine and the University of Southern Maine.

One man was killed in by a falling large tree branch through the windshield of his vehicle in Mechanicsburg, Pennsylvania, and a 60-year-old died in an accident with a snowplow in Massachusetts. Property damages was estimated at $3.9 million, mainly due to winds.

In Bangor, a 24-hour snowfall record was broken, with 21.5 in (54.6 cm) falling in one day. The storm was also Bangor's fourth largest snow event on record, and many other locations including Waterville and Lewiston received over 18 inches of snow. New Hampshire was also one of the hardest hit states from the storm, where many locations received over 2 feet of snow. The snow highest total in New Hampshire was in Jefferson, which received .

In Washington, D.C., parts of a three-story apartment building's roof was blown off by the  gusts in the area. A fallen tree on the tracks just north of New York City, was struck by a commuter train with around 100 passengers on board, stopping service for hours.

Eastern Canada 

The Meteorological Service of Canada issued winter weather warnings for northern Nova Scotia, New Brunswick, the east and south coasts of Newfoundland, and all of Prince Edward Island. School districts in most of these areas closed schools. Wind gusts reaching  were recorded along the coast near Halifax. All public transit in the area was cancelled. Nova Scotia Power and NB Power reported over 6,000 customers without electricity after the storm.

See also

 January 2014 United States blizzard
 January 2015 North American blizzard
 Early January 2017 North American winter storm
 February 9–11, 2017 North American blizzard

References

External links
Archive of Storm Summaries from the Weather Prediction Center

2016–17 North American winter
February 2017 events in the United States
Blizzards in the United States
Extratropical cyclones
2017 in New Jersey
2017 in New York (state)
2017 in Massachusetts
2017 in Rhode Island
2017 in Pennsylvania
2017 in Delaware
2017 in Maryland
2017 in Ohio
Nor'easters